Cymaenes tripunctus, known generally as the three-spotted skipper or dingy dotted skipper, is a species of grass skipper in the butterfly family Hesperiidae. It is found in the Caribbean Sea, Central America, North America, and South America.

Subspecies
These two subspecies belong to the species Cymaenes tripunctus:
 Cymaenes tripunctus theogenis Capronnier, 1874
 Cymaenes tripunctus tripunctus (Herrich-Schäffer, 1865)

References

Further reading

External links

 

Hesperiinae
Articles created by Qbugbot
Butterflies described in 1865